Asura rosacea is a moth of the family Erebidae. It is found in New Guinea.

References

rosacea
Moths described in 1904
Moths of New Guinea